Michael Hofmann (born 1957) is a German poet and translator.

Michael Hofmann may also refer to:

Michael Hofmann (sumi-e) (born 1948), American sumi-e / ink wash painter
Michael Hofmann (footballer, born 1972), German footballer
Michael Hofmann (footballer, born 1971), Swiss footballer

See also
Michael Hoffman (disambiguation)
Michael R. Hoffmann, American environmental engineer
Mike Hoffmann (fl. 1980–2021), American musician